Anzia is a genus of foliose lichens known as black-foam lichens in the large family Parmeliaceae. It was formerly included in the monogeneric family Anziaceae, but this has since been subsumed into the Parmeliaceae.

Taxonomy
The genus name of Anzia is in honour of Martino Anzi (1812-1883), an Italian botanist and professor of Theology from Como.

The genus was circumscribed by Ernst Stizenberger in 1862, with Anzia colpodes assigned as the type species. This lichen was originally described as Lichen colpodes by Erik Acharius in 1799.

In 1932, Yasuhiko Asahina divided the genus into three sections (Simplices, Duplices, and Nervosae) based on the structure of the medulla. When Isao Yoshimura later observed that Anzia japonica had two medulla types in a single species (i.e. both a single-layered and a double-layered medulla), he combined sections Simplices and Duplices into section Anziae.

Description
The narrow lobes that comprise the thallus are pale greyish white to greyish green in colour. It is one of the only groups in the family not to have eight spores in each ascus, but instead has numerous spores in each ascus (varying slightly from ascus to ascus). These ascospores are crescent shaped. A characteristic of the genus is the presence of a brown-black or pale brown spongy cushion called a spongiostratum, which covers the lower surface.

Pannoparmelia also has a spongiostratum, but in this genus the asci contain eight ascospores, and the upper cortex is yellow-green.

Distribution
The genus has a cosmopolitan distribution, but is concentrated in the Northern Hemisphere, particularly in Japan.

Evolutionary history
A fossilized Anzia, Anzia electra, was found in 35–40 Myr-old Baltic amber. Its features suggest that the main distinguishing characteristics in the thallus morphology of section Anzia have been retained for tens of millions of years.

Species

Anzia centrifuga  – Porto Santo, Madeira
Anzia colpodes (sack black-foam lichen)  
Anzia electra† 
Anzia entingiana  – New Zealand
Anzia flavotenuis  – Sri Lanka
Anzia formosana 
Anzia gallowayi  – Australia
Anzia hypoleucoides 
Anzia hypomelaena  – China
Anzia isidiosa  – New Guinea
Anzia japonica  – China; Japan
Anzia leucobatoides  – China
Anzia mahaeliyensis  – Sri Lanka
Anzia minor 
Anzia opuntiella  – Asia
Anzia ornata  – Asia; North America
Anzia pseudocolpota  – China
Anzia rhabdorhiza  – China
Anzia tianjarana  – Australia

References

Lecanorales genera
Parmeliaceae
Lichen genera
Taxa described in 1861
Taxa named by Ernst Stizenberger